Rear Admiral Tom Annan was a Ghanaian naval personnel and served in the Ghana Navy. He served as Chief of Naval Staff of the Ghana Navy from June 1990 to September 1996.

References

Ghanaian military personnel
Ghana Navy personnel
Chiefs of Naval Staff (Ghana)